Amblyseius sinuatus is a species of mite in the family Phytoseiidae.

References

sinuatus
Articles created by Qbugbot
Animals described in 1980